Coast Guard Air Station Humboldt Bay is a United States Coast Guard Air Station, with command and primary assets located at the Arcata-Eureka Airport in McKinleyville, California, 16 miles north of Eureka in Humboldt County. The station is the site of the command center for all Coast Guard personnel stationed and assets located on the coasts of Humboldt, Mendocino, and Del Norte Counties. It is one of five air stations in the Eleventh Coast Guard District.

Operations and missions 
Air Station Humboldt Bay consists of 4 MH-65D helicopters and the primary mission is search and rescue (SAR). Most cases are dramatic and lifesaving in nature due to the rough seas and generally poor weather conditions prevalent on the northern California coast. The Air Station also provides MEDEVAC support for injured personnel in the surrounding mountains. Secondary missions include aerial support for Aids to Navigation, Maritime Law enforcement, and Marine Environmental Protection along 250 miles of rugged coastline from the Mendocino-Sonoma County line north to the California-Oregon border.

The Command Center located at CGAS Humboldt Bay monitors for distress 24 hours a day and directs Coast Guard boats and aircraft to respond to any maritime emergency in the region; along the coast, well offshore, or even inland. The Group / Air Station also works with many local, state and federal agencies as needed.

History 

The Coast Guard has long had a presence on and about Humboldt Bay. Beginning in 1856 and continuing uninterrupted, the service has operated on Humboldt Bay and provided life-saving assistance on the Bay and all along the North Coast, out at sea and, as time went by, it has assisted other agencies, providing assistance in the interior in remote locations, on rivers and lakes and, especially, in mountainous terrain and in forests and related park and private lands as called upon.

On Humboldt Bay the USCG has operated at the same site continuously at least since 1878 based at its historic facility, the Humboldt Bay Life-Saving Station. Even with a cutter based at Eureka's docks and another at Crescent City, command in the modern era was split as air support was directed from San Francisco. However, on June 24, 1977 as the culmination of a multi-year initiative by local residents and groups to gain a year-round aviation search and rescue (SAR) facility for Northern California, the Coast Guard Group/Air Station Humboldt Bay was commissioned, complete with new assets, at the Arcata-Eureka Airport in McKinleyville, California. Prior to 1977, an aviation detachment from Coast Guard Air Station San Francisco provided air coverage during the summer season, but the response time of over two hours was not fast enough for victims to survive in the 40-50 degree water commonly found along the north coast. Originally named Air Station Arcata, the Group / Air Station was re-designated to its current name in May 1982. A modern $3.5 million facility constructed at the Arcata-Eureka Airport also relocated boat station command and control from the historic facility in Samoa to establish centralized command and control over all Coast Guard assets throughout the region.

References

External links 
 States Coast Guard official site
 CGAS Humboldt Bay official site
 Eleventh Coast Guard District official site
 HH-65 Air Stations

Buildings and structures in Humboldt County, California
United States Coast Guard Air Stations
Military installations in California
Airports in Humboldt County, California
1977 establishments in California